Caldwell is an unincorporated community in Orange County, North Carolina, United States. It is located at the junction of North Carolina Highway 57 and North Carolina Highway 157, northeast of Schley. Only a rural crossroads, it is the most significant community on fifteen mile stretches of both highways.

Caldwell is famous for the annual Fourth of July Parade that starts at the Caldwell Fire Department and ends at the Caldwell Community Center.

The Dr. Arch Jordan House was listed on the National Register of Historic Places in 1998.

References

Unincorporated communities in Orange County, North Carolina
Unincorporated communities in North Carolina